Enrique Zileri Gibson (4 June 1931 – 24 August 2014) was the publisher of Caretas (Masks), Peru's leading newsmagazine, which was cofounded by his mother Doris Gibson. He ran the magazine as "a symbol of resistance" against successive Peruvian dictators and their censors. He won many international honours, including the Maria Moors Cabot Prize (1975), but was twice deported by his own government, and the magazine was shut down at least eight times. The Peruvian Nobel laureate Mario Vargas Llosa called him an "indefatigable defender of freedom and democracy" who "could never be bribed or intimidated".

Early life and career
Enrique Zileri Gibson was born on 4 June 1931 in Lima, Peru. His father was Manlio Zileri Larco Aurelio. His mother, Doris Gibson, cofounded the newsmagazine Caretas with Francisco Igartua in October 1950. In childhood, he suffered from tuberculosis. He studied at Cornell University in the United States, but was forced to drop out when his family ran out of money. He took a job as a publicist, and later traveled in Europe while writing travel articles for Caretas. He described his travel in Europe as a "voyage of self-discovery".

Caretas
In the mid-1950s, Zileri joined Caretas full-time after returning to Peru from Europe. By that time the dictator Manuel A. Odria had already briefly shut down the magazine for "offending" him. In 1962, Francisco Igartua left Caretas to start his own political magazine Hey, which would also achieve wide popularity, and Zileri became a co-director of Caretas with his mother. The two provided in-depth news investigation and sharp opinions which increased the magazine's popularity, but also attracted the wrath of the Peruvian government. Between 1968 and 1979, the government shut down the magazine seven times, for almost two years in one occasion, and for five months in 1979. Zileri called Caretas "a symbol of resistance" against successive dictators and their censors, and was deported twice, to Portugal and Argentina, respectively. He was also sentenced to prison for three years for defaming government officials, before he was pardoned by an amnesty. Zileri gradually took over responsibilities from his mother, until Doris Gibson fully retired in the early 1990s.

During the authoritarian administration of Alberto Fujimori in the 1990s, Zileri took a principled stance against the government, at a time when Fujimori bribed many of Peru's television stations and newspapers. He exposed the past of the powerful spy chief Vladimiro Montesinos, and opposed Fujimori's attempt to extend his presidency for an unconstitutional third term. He was hit with a fine in 1992, and the magazine lost revenue due to government pressure on advertisers, but was vindicated when corruption scandals forced Fujimori from office in 2000. Fujimori was eventually convicted for human rights abuses.

Awards
In 1975, Columbia University awarded Zileri the Maria Moors Cabot Award for "excellence in coverage of Latin America and the Caribbean". He later became a judge for the award. He also served as the president of the International Press Institute, an organisation dedicated to the promotion and protection of press freedom.

Family
Zileri was married to Daphne Dougall, an Argentine of Scottish descent and a distinguished photographer, for 51 years. They had five children: Drusila, Diana, Domenica, Sebastian and Marco. Marco Zileri has taken over the leadership role at Caretas after his father's retirement.

Retirement and death
In the 2000s, Zileri ceded leadership of Caretas to his son Marco. On 25 August 2014, Zileri died in Lima from complications of throat cancer. His death was announced by Prime Minister Ana Jara.

References

1931 births
Peruvian people of Italian descent
Peruvian people of British descent
Peruvian people of Basque descent
Peruvian people of Argentine descent
Peruvian people of Spanish descent
Peruvian people of German descent
2014 deaths
Peruvian journalists
Male journalists
Peruvian male writers
People from Lima
Maria Moors Cabot Prize winners
Cornell University alumni